Silas Bent (April 4, 1768 – November 20, 1827) was an American attorney and jurist who served as a Judge of the Missouri Supreme Court from 1817 to 1821. His son, Charles Bent, was a fur trader and appointed as the first territorial governor of New Mexico. His other sons William, George, and Robert had been in business with Charles and built Bent's Old Fort and other outposts of trade in the American Southwest.

Early life
Silas Bent was born in Rutland, Massachusetts, on April 4, 1768, one of twelve children, to Silas Bent (1744–1818) and Mary Carter (1747–1831). Bent was a descendant of John Bent (1596–1672) a founder of Sudbury, Massachusetts. His father, also called Silas, may have been involved in the Boston Tea Party (there are differing opinions) and became a lieutenant colonel in the Massachusetts militia.

Bent studied law in Wheeling, West Virginia, under Philip Dodridge from the late-1780s. Upon marrying Martha Kerr, some time prior to 1800, he and his wife relocated to Charleston, West Virginia, where three of their children were born: Charles, Juliannah (also known as Julie Ann) and John.

Career 
Bent spent brief periods running a store, serving as postmaster of the courthouse in Brooke County, Virginia, and sitting as a judge in the court of common pleas. He moved his family to Washington County, Ohio, where he was appointed deputy surveyor in 1803 to Rufus Putnam, surveyor-general, and where their daughter Lucy was born in 1805.

In 1806, Bent became principal deputy surveyor of Louisiana Territory. He settled with his family in St. Louis on September 17 of that year. Bent became the first presiding judge of the St. Louis district court of common pleas on August 20, 1807; presiding judge on the St. Louis court of common pleas on November 9, 1809; and auditor of public accounts. President James Madison appointed him on February 21, 1813, as a member of the bench of the Missouri Supreme Court, where he served until 1821 when Missouri became a state. From 1821 until the year of his death, Bent was a clerk at the St. Louis County Court.

Bent had a stone house and water mill built in 1807 on the river bank in Carondelet, St. Louis.

Family
Four of Bent's sons entered the lucrative fur trade. Charles, born November 11, 1799, in Charleston, West Virginia, was the first to enter the trapping and trade business. George Bent recounted that his uncle worked about 1816 in the Upper Mississippi region for the American Fur Company. The historian David Lavender wrote that about 1817, Charles worked for the Missouri Fur Company. After establishing his own trading business with Ceran St. Vrain in 1832, Charles Bent was appointed as the first territorial governor of New Mexico in 1846.

William, born May 23, 1809, in St. Louis, entered the fur trade with his brother as a youth, about 1823 or 1824, beginning with learning to trap. At that time in the United States, boys of that age typically started a trade or career. About 1832 Charles and William took as their partner Ceran St. Vrain. George and Robert, born in St. Louis, joined in their brothers' enterprise. William Bent married a Cheyenne woman, Owl Woman. Their son George Bent, became an important informant of Cheyenne history and traditions, as well as serving as a soldier during the American Civil War and as a Cheyenne warrior.

Juliannah (also known as Julie Ann), born in Charleston, West Virginia, became the first wife of Lilburn Boggs, who later became governor of Missouri; she died in 1820. John, born in Charleston, West Virginia, became a distinguished lawyer in St. Louis. Lucy was born in 1805 in Ohio. 

Four more children were born in St. Louis; Silas junior served in the Navy. He was a flag Lieutenant on the expedition to Japan under Matthew C. Perry. Later, he was appointed to the St. Louis Board of Police Commissioners. Edward died at age six. Dorcas married judge William C. Carr. Mary married Major Jonathan L. Bean

Death
Bent died in St. Louis on November 20, 1827, having become a wealthy man. His financial legacy enabled Charles and William to embark on the venture that built Bent's Old Fort.

References
Notes

Citations

1768 births
1827 deaths
People from Rutland, Massachusetts
Judges of the Supreme Court of Missouri
People from Charleston, West Virginia
People of pre-statehood West Virginia
Virginia postmasters
People from Brooke County, West Virginia
People from St. Louis
19th-century American judges